Niamana may refer to:

Niamana, Ivory Coast
Niamana, Koulikoro, Mali
Niamana, Ségou, Mali